The 2020 Big East Conference men's soccer season will be the eighth season for the realigned Big East Conference. Including the history of the original Big East Conference, this will be the 25th season of men's soccer under the "Big East Conference" name.

Due to the COVID-19 pandemic, the fall season was postponed to the spring.

Entering the season, Georgetown were the defending conference tournament champions, as well as the defending conference regular season champions.

Changes from previous season

Teams

Spring 2021 season 
The earliest that the season can start is February 3, 2021.  The latest possible date is April 17.

Preseason poll 
The preseason poll will be released in December 2020 or January 2021.

Preseason national polls 
The preseason national polls were originally to be released in July and August 2020. Only CollegeSoccerNews.com released a preseason poll for 2020.

MLS SuperDraft 

The MLS SuperDraft was held on January 21, 2021 and was held virtually through its website. A total of five players from the Big East Conference were selected in the Draft. A record four Georgetown players were drafted.

Total picks by school

List of selections

References 

 
2020 NCAA Division I men's soccer season
Association football events postponed due to the COVID-19 pandemic